Congregation Rodeph Sholom is a Reform synagogue in New York City.  Founded in 1842 by immigrants from the German lands, it is one of the oldest synagogues in the United States.

History 
City directories from the year 1845 to 1853 list the congregation as having met at 156 Attorney Street. The first building constructed by Rodeph Sholom, at 8 Clinton Street on the Lower East Side in 1853, is still in use by Congregation Chasam Sopher. It is the second-oldest surviving synagogue building in New York City and the fifth-oldest synagogue building in the United States still standing.

Rodeph Sholom moved to Lexington Avenue and 63rd Street, to a new Victorian Romanesque building designed by D. & J. Jardine and built in 1872-73 for Ansche Chesed.  A man named Simeon Abrahams conveyed land to the congregation for a burial ground in 1842. This cemetery was on 88th Street between Madison and Park Avenues.  By 1879, there had not been a burial in twenty-six years. It was removed sometime in between 1897 and 1911.

Rudolph Grossman was rabbi of Rodeph Sholom from 1896 until his death in 1927.

In 1930, Rodeph Sholom moved to its present location at 7 West 83rd Street on the Upper West Side. The move was supervised by Mitchell Fisher; then acting rabbi of the congregation, he would resign a month later due to what he described as "institutional restraint". The Romanesque temple house and sanctuary, designed by Charles B. Meyers, were built between 1929–30 and dedicated on Purim in March 1930.

Benjamin H. Spratt is the senior Rabbi. Shoshana Nambi, the rabbinical intern and author of the best selling children’s book, The Very Best Sukkah (Kalaniot Books, 2022), grew up in the Ugandan Abayudaya communities, and intends to become the first female rabbi for the community following her ordination from Hebrew Union College in 2024.

Day school
In 1970, Rodeph Sholom opened the first Reform movement Jewish day school in the United States. Its goal is to help Jews become self-aware adults in the world today. In 1972, the school expanded to move all the way through sixth grade, and since then it has expanded through eighth grade. The elementary and middle school stands on 79th Street, between Amsterdam and Columbus Avenue.

Danny Karpf is Head of School.

Notable congregants
Joshua Lionel Cowen
Robert Lansing (actor)
Joseph E. Newburger
Mack Rossoff
Jerry Seinfeld
Randi Zuckerberg

See also

Oldest synagogues in the United States

External links

References

German-Jewish culture in New York City
Synagogues in Manhattan
Religious organizations established in 1842
Reform synagogues in New York City
Romanesque Revival synagogues
Upper West Side
1842 establishments in New York (state)